Dear Youth is the fourth album by American metalcore band the Ghost Inside, and was released on November 17, 2014. It is the last release to feature guitarist Aaron Brooks. The album spawned two major singles: in order of release, "Avalanche" and "Dear Youth (Day 52)". Music videos were released for "Out Of Control", "Dear Youth (Day 52)", and "Move Me". An official live video was released for "Avalanche". Dear Youth was the last album released before the band's drastic tour bus crash that killed their driver and inflicted life-threatening injuries to the band members.

Track listing

Credits

The Ghost Inside
Jonathan Vigil – lead vocals
Aaron Brooks – lead guitar, backing vocals
Jim Riley – bass, backing vocals
Zack Johnson – rhythm guitar
Andrew Tkaczyk – drums

Production
Produced by Jeremy McKinnon & Andrew Wade
Engineered by Andrew Wade, at The Wade Studios
Mixed by David Bendeth
Mastered by Ted Jensen
Composers: David Tiano (3), Jeremy McKinnon & Andrew Wade
Phonographic Copyright: Epitaph
Art direction by Jonathan Vigil
Layout by Jason Link
Artwork by Colin Marks

Charts

References

2014 albums
The Ghost Inside (band) albums
Albums produced by Jeremy McKinnon
Albums produced by Andrew Wade